Events from the year 1946 in the United States.

Incumbents

Federal Government 
 President: Harry S. Truman (D-Missouri)
 Vice President: vacant
 Chief Justice: Harlan F. Stone (New York) (until April 22), Fred M. Vinson (Kentucky) (starting June 24)
 Speaker of the House of Representatives: Sam Rayburn (D-Texas)
 Senate Majority Leader: Alben W. Barkley (D-Kentucky)
 Congress: 79th

Events

January–March

 January 6 – A revised revival of Jerome Kern and Oscar Hammerstein II's  Show Boat opens on Broadway at the Ziegfeld Theatre.
 January 17 – U.S. Senator Dennis Chávez (D-NM) calls for a vote on a Fair Employment Practice Committee bill which calls for an end to discrimination in the workplace. A filibuster prevents it from passing.
 January 25 – The United Mine Workers rejoins the American Federation of Labor.
 January 29 – The Central Intelligence Group is established (the CIA in 1947).
 February 12 – Isaac Woodard, an African American army veteran, is beaten and blinded by police chief Lynwood Shull in Batesburg, South Carolina, an event which is brought to national attention on Orson Welles's radio show.
 February 14 – ENIAC (for "Electronic Numerical Integrator and Computer"), the first general-purpose electronic computer, is unveiled at the University of Pennsylvania.
 February 18 – President Truman signs the Rescission Act of 1946 annulling benefits payable to Filipino troops who fought for the U.S. during World War II.
 February 28 – In Philadelphia, General Electric strikers and police clash.
 March 5 – In his speech at Westminster College, in Fulton, Missouri, Winston Churchill talks about the Iron Curtain.
 March 6 – Vietnam War: Ho Chi Minh signs an agreement with France which recognizes Vietnam as an autonomous state in the Indochinese Federation and the French Union.
 March 7 – The 18th Academy Awards ceremony, hosted by James Stewart and Bob Hope, is held at Grauman's Chinese Theatre in Hollywood, Los Angeles, the first ceremony after World War II. Billy Wilder's The Lost Weekend wins the most awards with four, including Best Motion Picture and Best Director for Wilder. Leo McCarey's The Bells of St. Mary's receives the most nominations with eight.
 March 21 – The Los Angeles Rams of the National Football League, newly relocated from Cleveland, sign Kenny Washington, making him the first African American player in the league since 1933.
 March 24 – BBC Home Service radio in the United Kingdom broadcasts Alistair Cooke's first American Letter. As Letter from America, this programme will continue until a few weeks before Cooke's death in 2004.

April–June
 April 1 – The 8.6  Aleutian Islands earthquake affects Alaska with a maximum Mercalli intensity of VI (Strong), causing a destructive basin wide tsunami, leaving 165–173 dead.
 April 18 – The United States recognizes Josip Broz Tito's government in Yugoslavia.
 April 20 – Walt Disney's eighth feature film, Make Mine Music, is released. It is Disney's third of six package films to be released through the 1940s.
 April 22 – Girouard v. United States, a citizenship case decided in the Supreme Court, overturns the decision in United States v. Schwimmer (1929).
 April 23
The Eastern Pennsylvania Basketball League (later the Continental Basketball Association (CBA)) is founded.
Howard Hughes's Western movie The Outlaw (1943), starring Jane Russell, goes on general release.
 May 2 – Six inmates unsuccessfully try to escape from Alcatraz Federal Penitentiary in San Francisco Bay; a riot occurs, the "Battle of Alcatraz".
 May 10 – The first V-2 rocket to be successfully launched in the U.S. is fired from White Sands Missile Range.
 May 21 – Manhattan Project physicist Dr. Louis Slotin accidentally triggers a fission reaction at the Los Alamos National Laboratory and, although saving his coworkers, gives himself a lethal dose of hard radiation, making him the second victim of a criticality accident in history (the incident is initially treated as classified information).
 May 23 – Dwarf Grill, predecessor of Chick-fil-A, a fast food chicken restaurant, is founded in Georgia.
 June 6 – The Basketball Association of America is formed in New York City, later renamed the National Basketball Association.
 June 17 
The 1946 Windsor-Tecumseh, Ontario tornado on the Detroit River kills 17.
Laurence Olivier's Henry V opens in the United States nearly 2 years after its release in the UK. It is the first Shakespeare film in color, and critics hail it as the finest film of a Shakespeare play ever made.

July–September

 July 4 – The Philippines is granted independence by the United States.
 July 7 
 Mother Frances Xavier Cabrini becomes the first American to be canonized by the Roman Catholic Church.
 Howard Hughes nearly dies when a test flight of the Hughes XF-11 crashes in a Beverly Hills neighborhood due to a propeller malfunction.
 July 14 – Benjamin Spock's influential The Common Sense Book of Baby and Child Care is published.
 July 25 
Nuclear testing: In the first underwater test of the atomic bomb, the surplus  is sunk near Bikini Atoll in the Pacific Ocean, when the United States detonates the Baker device during Operation Crossroads.
At Club 500 in Atlantic City, New Jersey, Dean Martin and Jerry Lewis stage their first show as a comedy team.
1946 Georgia lynching: In the last mass lynching in the United States, a mob of white men shoot and kill two African-American couples near Moore's Ford Bridge in Georgia.
 August 1 
 President Truman signs the Atomic Energy Act of 1946, which establishes the United States Atomic Energy Commission.
 The Fulbright Program, a system of U.S. international educational exchange scholarships, is established.
 August 25 – American golfer Ben Hogan wins the PGA Championship.
 September 15 – DuMont Television Network begins broadcasting regularly.
 September 22 – Yogi Berra makes his Major League Baseball debut, entering a game for the New York Yankees against the Philadelphia A's and hitting a home run in his first time at bat.
 September 24 – White House counsel Clark Clifford presents President Truman with a top secret report authored by George Elsey on American Relations with the Soviet Union which forms the basis of the U.S. policy of containment.

October–December
 October 15 – The St. Louis Cardinals defeat the Boston Red Sox, 4 games to 3, to win their 6th World Series Title in baseball.
 October 16 – The United Nations' first meeting in Long Island is held.
 November 1 – The New York Knicks play against the Toronto Huskies at the Maple Leaf Gardens, in the first Basketball Association of America game. The Knicks win 68–66.
 November 6 – Senate and House elections in the United States both give majorities to the Republicans.
 November 12 – In Chicago, a branch of the Exchange National Bank (later part of the LaSalle Bank) opens the first 10 drive-up teller windows.
 November 27 – Cold War: Indian Prime Minister Jawaharlal Nehru appeals to the United States and the Soviet Union to end nuclear testing and to start nuclear disarmament, stating that such an action would "save humanity from the ultimate disaster."
 December 2 – The International Convention for the Regulation of Whaling is signed in Washington, D.C. to "provide for the proper conservation of whale stocks and thus make possible the orderly development of the whaling industry" through establishment of the International Whaling Commission.
 December 5 – President Truman establishes the President's Committee on Civil Rights to investigate the status of civil rights in the United States and propose measures to strengthen and protect the civil rights of American citizens.
 December 7 – A fire at the Winecoff Hotel in Atlanta, Georgia kills 119.
 December 14
 Proposed United States purchase of Greenland from Denmark: An offer is made through diplomatic channels.
 Aspen Skiing Company opens Aspen Mountain (ski area) in Colorado with Ski Lift No. 1, at  the world's longest chairlift at this time.
 December 20 – Frank Capra's It's a Wonderful Life, featuring James Stewart, Donna Reed, Lionel Barrymore, Henry Travers, and Thomas Mitchell, is released in New York.
 December 22 – The Havana Conference begins between U.S. organized crime bosses in Havana, Cuba.
 December 26 – The Flamingo Hotel opens on the Las Vegas Strip.
 December 31 – President Harry S. Truman delivers Proclamation 2714, which officially ends hostilities in World War II.

Undated
 Airport Homes race riots in Chicago.
 The 20 mm M61 Vulcan Gatling gun contract is released.
 The All-America Football Conference team San Francisco 49ers is formed.
 Kegg's Candies is founded in Houston, Texas.
 The first Tupperware is sold in department and hardware stores in the United States.
 Binghamton University is founded in New York (state).

Births

January 
Jeffrey Cohen 

 January 1 – Shelby Steele, American journalist, author, and director
 January 3 – Cissy King, American dancer, singer
 January 5 – Diane Keaton, American actress, film director (Annie Hall)
 January 7
Michele Elliott, author, psychologist and founder of child protection charity Kidscape
Michael Roizen, American anesthesiologist and author
 January 8
 Robby Krieger, American rock musician (The Doors)
 Stanton Peele, American psychologist
 January 11
 Naomi Judd, American country singer (d. 2022)
 John Piper, American theologian
 January 12 – George Duke, African-American musician (d. 2013)
 January 16 – Michael Coats, American astronaut
 January 19 – Dolly Parton, American singer-songwriter, actress, businesswoman and philanthropist
 January 20 – David Lynch, American film director
 January 21 – Johnny Oates, American baseball player, manager (d. 2004)
 January 23 – Don Whittington, American race car driver
 January 25 – Doc Bundy, American race car driver and technician
 January 26
 Deon Jackson, American singer-songwriter (d. 2014)
 Gene Siskel, American film critic (Sneak Previews) (d. 1999)
 January 27 – Nedra Talley, African-American singer (The Ronettes)
 January 29 – Bettye LaVette, African-American soul singer, songwriter
 January 31 – Terry Kath, American rock musician (Chicago) (d. 1978)

February 

 February 2 – Blake Clark, American actor, comedian
 February 6 – Jim Turner, American politician
 February 7 – Sammy Johns, American singer-songwriter (d. 2013)
 February 9 – Jim Webb, American politician
 February 13
 Richard Blumenthal, American politician
 Joe Estevez, American actor
 February 14 – Gregory Hines, African-American dancer, actor (d. 2003)
 February 16 – Marvin Sease, American blues, and soul singer-songwriter (d. 2011)
 February 19 – Karen Silkwood, American activist (d. 1974)
 February 20 – J. Geils, American guitarist (The J. Geils Band) (d. 2017)
 February 21
 Tyne Daly, American actress (Cagney & Lacey)
 Monica Johnson, American screenwriter (d. 2010)
 Jim Ryan, American politician and lawyer (d. 2022)
 February 28
 Don Ciccone, American singer, songwriter (The Critters) (d. 2016)
 Don Francisco, American Christian musician
 Syreeta Wright, African-American singer, songwriter ("With You I'm Born Again") (d. 2004)

March 

 March 1 – Lana Wood, American actress, producer
 March 7
 John Heard, American actor (d. 2017)
 Peter Wolf, American rock musician (The J. Geils Band)
 March 10 – Mike Davis American scholar (d. 2022)
 March 12
 Frank Welker, American voice actor, singer
 Liza Minnelli, American singer, actress
 March 13 – Yonatan Netanyahu, American-born Israeli soldier (d. 1976 in Israel)
 March 15 – Bobby Bonds, American baseball player, manager (d. 2003)
 March 17 – Larry Langford, American politician (d. 2019)
 March 24 – Kitty O'Neil, speed record holder and stuntwoman (d. 2018)
 March 26 – Johnny Crawford, American child actor, musician (The Rifleman)
 March 27 – Mike Jackson, American former MLB pitcher

April 

 April 3 – Rod Gaspar, American baseball player
 April 8
 Catfish Hunter, American baseball player (d. 1999)
 Tim Thomerson, American actor, comedian
 April 9 –  Nate Colbert, American baseball player (d. 2023)
 April 10 – David Angell, American television producer (d. 2001)
 April 11 – Chris Burden, American artist (d. 2015)
 April 12 – Ed O'Neill, American actor (Married... with Children)
 April 13 – Al Green, American singer, songwriter and record producer
 April 15 – Marsha Hunt, American actress, singer and novelist
 April 16 – Margot Adler, American journalist (d. 2014)
 April 20 – Tommy Hutton, American baseball player and sportscaster
 April 22 – John Waters, American film director 
 April 24  
 Stafford James, bassist and composer
 Phil Robertson, American businessman and reality television personality
 April 25
 Talia Shire, American actress (Rocky)
 Strobe Talbott, American journalist
 April 26 – Richard S. Fuld Jr., American banker
 April 28 – Larissa Grunig, American public relations theorist, feminist
 April 30 – Bill Plympton, American animator, graphic designer, cartoonist, and filmmaker

May 

 May 2 – Lesley Gore, American rock singer ("It's My Party") (d. 2015)
 May 5 – Jim Kelly, African-American actor, martial artist and tennis player (d. 2013)
 May 6 
 Larry Huber, American television producer, animator
 Grier Jones, American golfer and coach 
 May 7 – Thelma Houston, African-American singer ("Don't Leave Me This Way")
 May 9 – Candice Bergen, American actress (Murphy Brown)
 May 11 – Robert Jarvik, American physicist, artificial heart inventor
 May 12 – Richard Bruce Silverman, John Evans Professor of Chemistry at Northwestern University
 May 18
 Reggie Jackson, African-American baseball player
 Andreas Katsulas, American actor (d. 2006)
 May 20
 Craig Patrick, American-Canadian hockey player, coach and manager
 Cher, born Cherilyn Sarkisian, singer, songwriter and actress
 May 30 – Candy Lightner, American founder of Mothers Against Drunk Driving

June 

 June 4 – Suzanne Ciani, American pianist, electronic composer
 June 7 – Robert Tilton, American televangelist, author
 June 13 – Paul L. Modrich, American biochemist and recipient of the Nobel Prize in Chemistry in 2015
 June 14 – Donald Trump, American businessman, television producer, politician, 45th President of the United States from 2017 to 2021
 June 15 – Janet Lennon, American singer (The Lennon Sisters)
 June 16 – Jodi Rell, American politician
 June 17 – Marcy Kaptur, American politician
 June 18 – Bruiser Brody, American professional wrestler (d. 1988)
 June 20
 Bob Vila, American television host
 Joseph Waeckerle, American physician and diplomat
 June 22 – Kay Redfield Jamison, American psychiatrist
 June 23 – Ted Shackelford, American actor
 June 24
 Ellison Onizuka, American astronaut (d. 1986)
 Robert Reich, 22nd United States Secretary of Labor
 June 26
 Leo Rossi, American actor
 Ricky Jay, American actor, author, and magician (d. 2018)
 June 27 – Russ Critchfield, American basketball player
 June 28 – Gilda Radner, American comedian, actress (Saturday Night Live) (d. 1989)

July 

 July 2 – Richard Axel, American scientist, recipient of the Nobel Prize in Physiology or Medicine
 July 4
 Michael Milken, American financier, financial criminal and philanthropist
 Ed O'Ross, American actor
 July 6
 George W. Bush, 43rd President of the United States from 2001 to 2009
 Sylvester Stallone, American actor, filmmaker and screenwriter
 Fred Dryer, American football defensive end, actor (Hunter)
 Jamie Wyeth, American painter
 July 10
 Sue Lyon, American actress (d. 2019)
 Oliver Martin, American cyclist
 July 11 – Jack Wrangler, porn star (d. 2009)
 July 13 – Cheech Marin, Mexican-American actor, comedian (Cheech and Chong)
 July 14 – Vincent Pastore, actor
 July 15 – Linda Ronstadt, singer and songwriter  
 July 16
 Dave Goelz, puppeteer
 Barbara Lee, politician
 Ron Yary, American football player
 July 19 – Suzanne de Passe, music and screen producer
 July 22 – Danny Glover, African-American actor, film director and political activist
 July 23 
 Sally Flynn, American singer
 Khan Jamal, American musician (d. 2022)
 July 27 
 Larry Biittner, American baseball player (d. 2022)
 Gwynne Gilford, American actress
 July 28 – Jonathan Edwards, American singer, songwriter and guitarist
 July 30 – Neil Bonnett, American race car driver (d. 1994)

August 

 August 1
 Mike Emrick, American sportscaster
 Sandi Griffiths, American singer
 August 5
 Ron Silliman, American poet
 Loni Anderson, American actress (WKRP in Cincinnati)
 Shirley Ann Jackson, African American physicist and academic administrator
 August 9 – Jim Kiick, American football player
 August 13 – Janet Yellen, American Chair of the Federal Reserve
 August 14 – Dennis Hof, American brothel owner (d. 2018)
 August 16 – Lesley Ann Warren, American actress, singer
 August 17 – Drake Levin, American rock guitarist (Paul Revere & the Raiders) (d. 2009)
 August 19
 Charles Bolden, African-American astronaut
 Bill Clinton, 42nd President of the United States from 1993 to 2001
 August 20 – Connie Chung, Asian-American reporter
 August 25
 Nancy Blomberg, American art curator (d. 2018)
 Rollie Fingers, American baseball player
 Charles Ghigna, American poet, children's author
 August 26
 Valerie Simpson, African-American singer
 Mark Snow, American composer
 Swede Savage, American race car driver (d. 1973)
 August 29 – Bob Beamon, American athlete
 August 30 – Peggy Lipton, American actress and model (d. 2019)
 August 31
 Jerome Corsi, American political commentator and conspiracy theorist
 Tom Coughlin, American football player, coach, and executive

September 

 September 2
 Billy Preston, African-American soul musician ("Nothing from Nothing") (d. 2006)
 Dan White, American politician, murderer (d. 1985)
 September 4
 Gary Duncan, American rock guitarist (Quicksilver Messenger Service) (d. 2019)
 Greg Elmore, American rock drummer (Quicksilver Messenger Service)
 September 5
 Dennis Dugan, American actor, director
 Loudon Wainwright III, American songwriter, folk singer, humorist, and actor
 September 7 – Willie Crawford, American baseball player (d. 2004)
 September 10 – Jim Hines, American athlete
 September 14 – Jim Angle, American journalist and television reporter (d. 2022)
 September 15
 Tommy Lee Jones, American actor and filmmaker
 Oliver Stone, American film director, screenwriter, producer and veteran.
 September 18 
 Peter Alsop, American musician
 Otis Sistrunk, American football player and wrestler
 September 19 – Connie Kreski, American model (d. 1995)
 September 20 – Dorothy Hukill, American politician (d. 2018)
 September 21 – Richard St. Clair, American musician, composer
 September 25 – Jerry Penrod, American bass player
 September 26
 Andrea Dworkin, American feminist, writer (d. 2005)
 Christine Todd Whitman, American politician
 September 28 – Jeffrey Jones, American actor
 September 30 – Diego Cortez, American filmmaker and art curator. (d. 2021)

October 

 October 1 – Tim O'Brien, author
 October 3 – P. P. Arnold, singer
 October 4
 Chuck Hagel, politician, 24th United States Secretary of Defense
 October 5 – Heather MacRae, actress 
 October 6 
 Gene Clines, baseball player and coach (d. 2022)
 Lloyd Doggett, politician
 October 7 – Catharine A. MacKinnon, feminist
 October 8 – John T. Walton, son of Wal-Mart founder Sam Walton (d. 2005)
 October 10 – John Prine, country folk singer (d. 2020)
 October 11 – Daryl Hall, rock musician (Hall & Oates)
 October 12 – Drew Edmondson, politician
 October 13
 Dorothy Moore, singer
 Demond Wilson, African-American actor, minister (Sanford and Son)
 October 14 – Craig Venter, biotechnologist
 October 15
 Richard Carpenter, American pop musician, composer (The Carpenters)
 John Getz, American actor
 October 16 – Suzanne Somers, American actress, singer (Three's Company)
 October 17 – Bob Seagren, American athlete, actor
 October 18 – James Robert Baker, American novelist, screenwriter
 October 23 – Mel Martinez, American politician
 October 26 – Pat Sajak, American game-show host (Wheel of Fortune)
 October 29 – Kathryn J. Whitmire, Texas politician, mayor of Houston
 October 30
 Lynne Marta, American actress
 Andrea Mitchell, American journalist

November 

 November 1 – Lynne Russell, American newsreader
 November 4
 Laura Bush, former First Lady of the United States
 Les Lannom, American actor, musician
 Robert Mapplethorpe, American photographer (d. 1989)
 November 5
 Loleatta Holloway, American singer (d. 2011)
 Gram Parsons, American musician (d. 1973)
 November 6 – Sally Field, American actress, singer (The Flying Nun)
 November 10 – Alaina Reed Hall, American actress (d. 2009)
 November 11 
 Corrine Brown, American politician, fraudster 
 Sandy Skoglund, American photographer
 November 14 – Sacheen Littlefeather, American actress, model and Native American civil rights activist (d. 2022)
 November 16
 Barbara Leigh, American fashion model and film actress in the 1970s
 Terence McKenna, American writer, philosopher, ethnobotanist and shaman (d. 2000)
 Jo Jo White, American basketball player (d. 2018)
 November 17 – Terry Branstad, American politician
 November 18 – Alan Dean Foster, American novelist
 November 20
 J. Blackfoot, American singer (The Soul Children) (d. 2011)
 Greg Cook, American football player (d, 2012)
 Judy Woodruff, American television reporter
 Duane Allman, American rock guitarist, co-founder and leader of the Allman Brothers Band (d. 1971)
 Samuel E. Wright, American actor and singer (d. 2021)
 November 23 – Bobby Rush, African-American politician, activist and pastor
 November 24 
 Ted Bundy, American serial killer (d. 1989)
 Jimmy Collins, American basketball player and coach (d. 2020)
 November 27 – Richard Codey, American politician, 53rd Governor of New Jersey
 November 29 – Suzy Chaffee, American singer, actress
 November 30 – Barbara Cubin, U.S. Congresswoman from Wyoming

December 

 December 1
 Jonathan Katz, American comedian and actor
 Jimmy McMillan, founder of the Rent Is Too Damn High Party, political activist, perennial candidate
 December 4 – Sherry Alberoni, American actress, voice artist
 December 6
 Frankie Beverly, American singer-songwriter and producer
 Nancy Brinker, American health activist, diplomat
 December 8 – John Rubinstein, American actor, director and composer
 December 9 – Dennis Dunaway, American bassist and composer
 December 10
 Chrystos, American poet
 Thomas Lux, American poet and academic
 December 11
 Susan Kyle, American writer
 Ellen Meloy, American writer (d. 2004)
 December 12 
 Josepha Sherman, American author, folklorist and anthropologist (d. 2012)
 Paula Wagner, American film producer and executive
 Gloria Loring, American singer
 Don Gummer, American sculptor
 December 13 – Heather North, American television, voice actress (d. 2017)
 December 14 
 Patty Duke, American actress (d. 2016)
 Lynne Marie Stewart, American actress
 December 16 – Alice Aycock, American sculptor
 December 18 – Steven Spielberg, American film director, screenwriter, producer and executive
 December 19
 Candace Pert, American neuroscientist
 Robert Urich, American actor (Vega$) (d. 2002)
 December 20
 John Spencer, American actor (d. 2005)
 Lloyd Mumphord, American football player
 Sonny Perdue, politician, 81st Governor of Georgia
 Dick Wolf, American television producer
 December 21 – Carl Wilson, American musician (The Beach Boys) (d. 1998)
 December 23 – Susan Lucci, American actress (General Hospital)
 December 24
 Brenda Howard, American bisexual activist (d. 2005)
 Jeff Sessions, American politician, United States Attorney General
 December 25
 Jimmy Buffett, American rock singer, songwriter ("Margaritaville")
 Larry Csonka, American football player
 Gene Lamont, American baseball player, manager
 December 27 – Lenny Kaye, American guitarist
 December 28
 Mike Beebe, American politician, attorney
 Tim Johnson, American politician
 Edgar Winter, American rock musician ("Frankenstein")
 December 29 – Paul S. Trible, Jr., American politician
 December 30 – Patti Smith, American poet, singer

Date unknown 
Tyler Burge, philosopher

Deaths

January 
 January 3 – William Joyce, Nazi propaganda broadcaster (executed) (born 1906)
 January 5 – Kitty Cheatham, singer (born 1864)
 January 6 – Slim Summerville, actor (born 1892)
 January 9 – Countee Cullen, African American poet (born 1903)
 January 10 – Harry Von Tilzer, songwriter (born 1872)
 January 29 
 Harry Hopkins, politician (born 1890)
 Adriaan van Maanen, astronomer (born 1884 in the Netherlands)

February 
 February 2 – Rondo Hatton, film character actor (born 1894)
 February 15
 Putney Dandridge, African American jazz musician (born 1902)
 Cornelius Johnson, athlete (born 1913)
 February 17 – Dorothy Gibson, silent film actress and model (born 1889)
 February 21 – Theodore Stark Wilkinson, admiral (born 1888)
 February 26 – Jackie, MGM lion (born 1915 in Nubia)

March 
 March 2 – George E. Stewart, Medal of Honor recipient (born 1872)
 March 3 – Pauline Whittier, golfer (born 1876)
 March 23 – Gilbert N. Lewis, chemist (born 1875)

April 
 April 1
 Noah Beery Sr., actor (born 1882)
 Edward Sheldon, playwright (born 1886)
 April 2 – Kate Bruce, silent film actress (born 1858)
 April 5 – Vincent Youmans, Broadway composer (born 1898)
 April 14 – Otto Dowling, Captain (USN) and 25th Governor of American Samoa (born 1881)
 April 20 – Mae Busch, film actress (born 1891)
 April 22 – Harlan F. Stone, Chief Justice of the United States (born 1872)

May 
 May 1 – Bill Johnston, tennis player (born 1894)
 May 2 – Simon Flexner, pathologist and bacteriologist (born 1863)
 May 19 – Booth Tarkington, novelist (born 1869)
 May 25 – Patty Hill, nursery teacher and co-composer of "Happy Birthday to You" (born 1868)

June 
 June 2 – Carrie Ingalls, younger sister of author Laura Ingalls Wilder (born 1870)
 June 10 – Jack Johnson, African American heavyweight boxer (born 1878)
 June 13 – Edward Bowes, radio personality (born 1874)
 June 14 – Charles Butterworth, comic actor (born 1896)
 June 23 – William S. Hart, stage actor and silent film cowboy star (born 1864/1865)
 June 27 – Wanda Gág, artist, author, translator and illustrator (born 1893)
 June 28 – Antoinette Perry, actress and director (born 1888)
 June 30 – Howard Hyde Russell, founder of the Anti-Saloon League (born 1855)

July 
 July 2 – Mary Alden, stage and screen actress (born 1883)
 July 8 – Orrick Glenday Johns, poet and playwright (born 1887)
 July 12 – Ray Stannard Baker, journalist and author (born 1870)
 July 13 – Alfred Stieglitz, photographer (born 1864)
 July 14 – Riley Puckett, country musician (born 1894)
 July 20 – Tricky Sam Nanton, trombonist (born 1904)
 July 27 – Gertrude Stein, writer (born 1874)

August 
 August 6 – Tony Lazzeri, baseball player (New York Yankees) (born 1903)
 August 26 – Jeanie MacPherson, film actress and screenwriter (born 1887)
 August 28 – Florence Turner, film actress (born 1885)
 August 29 – John Steuart Curry, painter (born 1897)

September 
 September 16 – Mamie Smith, African American vaudeville performer and blues singer (born 1883)
 September 17 – Frank Burke, baseball player (born 1880)
 September 21 – Lydia J. Newcomb Comings, American educator (born 1850)
 September 23 – Rosa Lee Tucker, librarian (born 1866)
 September 26 – William Strunk, Jr., professor of English (born 1869)

October 
 October 4 – Barney Oldfield, race car driver and automobile pioneer (born 1878)
 October 9 – Enrica Clay Dillon, opera singer (born 1881)
 October 12 – Joseph Stilwell, general (born 1883)

November 
 November 5 – Joseph Stella, Futurist painter (born 1877 in Italy)
 November 7 – Henry Lehrman, film director (born 1886 in Austria)
 November 23 – Arthur Dove, abstract painter (born 1880)
 November 25 – George Gandy, entrepreneur (born 1851)

December 
 December 7 – Laurette Taylor, stage and silent film actress (born 1884)
 December 10
 Walter Johnson, baseball player (Washington Senators) (born 1887)
 Damon Runyon, short-story writer (born 1880)
 December 13 – Curtis Hidden Page, New Hampshire politician (born 1870)
 December 14 – Tom Dowse, baseball player (born 1866 in Ireland)
 December 16 – Zachary Taylor Davis, Chicago architect (born 1872)
 December 23 – John A. Sampson, gynecologist (born 1873)
 December 25 – W. C. Fields, comic actor (born 1880)
 December 28
 Carrie Jacobs-Bond, singer-songwriter (born 1862)
 Elie Nadelman, sculptor (born 1882 in Poland)

See also
 List of American films of 1946
 Timeline of United States history (1930–1949)

References

External links
 

 
1940s in the United States
United States
United States
Years of the 20th century in the United States